Pipariya Assembly constituency is one of the 230 constituencies in the Madhya Pradesh Legislative Assembly of Madhya Pradesh, a central state of India. Pipariya is also part of Narmadapuram Lok Sabha constituency. It is a reserved seat for the Scheduled Caste (SC).

Members of Legislative Assembly

 1951: Narayan Singh, Indian National Congress
 1962: Ratan Kumari, Indian National Congress
 1967: Ratan Kumari, Indian National Congress
 1972: Ratan Kumari, Indian National Congress
 1977: Ram Chandra Maheshwari, Janata Party
 1980: Savita Banerjee, Indian National Congress (I)
 1985: Tribhuwan Yadav, Indian National Congress
 1990: Murli Dhar Maheshwari, Bharatiya Janata Party
 1993: Suresh Rai, Indian National Congress
 1998: Harishankar Jaiswal, Bharatiya Janata Party
 2003: Arjun Paliya, Samajwadi Party
 2008: Thakur Das, Bharatiya Janata Party
 2013: Thakurdas Nagwanshi, Bharatiya Janata Party
 2018 :Thakurdas Nagwanshi, Bharatiya Janata Party

See also

 Pipariya,Narmadapuram
 List of constituencies of Madhya Pradesh Legislative Assembly
 Narmadapuram

References

Assembly constituencies of Madhya Pradesh
Hoshangabad
Hoshangabad district